William Stott may refer to:

William Henry Stott (1863–1930), British member of parliament for Birkenhead West 1924–1929, and Birkenhead East 1924–1929
William Stott (artist) (1857–1900) British painter
Billy Stott, British rugby league footballer
William Stott (trade unionist) (1879–1956), General Secretary of the Transport Salaried Staffs' Association 1936–1940

See also
William Stott Banks, antiquary